Vladimir Ciobanu (born 25 April 1953) is a Moldovan politician.

Biography 
He served as member of the Parliament of Moldova (2005–2009) on the lists of the Democratic Moldova Bloc (from OMA). In 2006 he left the "Our Moldova" Alliance. In December 2009 he joined the Democratic Party of Moldova, shortly after being elected as general secretary of the party.

External links 
 Parlamentul Republicii Moldova
  List of candidates to the position of deputy in the Parliament of the Republic of Moldova for parliamentary elections of 6 March, 2005 of the Electoral Bloc “Moldova Democrata”
 List of deputies elected in the March 6 parliamentary elections
 Lista deputaţilor aleşi la 6 martie 2005 în Parlamentul Republicii Moldova

References

1953 births
Living people
Moldovan MPs 2005–2009
Electoral Bloc Democratic Moldova MPs
Our Moldova Alliance politicians